Nuraghe Fenu is a nuraghe located in the municipality of Pabillonis in Sardinia. It was constructed in the mid-Bronze Age (1300–1150 BC) and it covers an area of 2000 m2. Vittorio Angius, a 19th-century historian, described it as one of the biggest nuraghi of Sardinia, akin to nuraghe Saurecci and nuraghe S'Orku.

Description 

It is near the train station of Pabillonis in the countryside. In the 19th century, it was used to build a railway bridge and houses near Pabillonis.

Excavations 

Excavations started in 1996, allowing archaeologists to study the stratigraphy of the ground. The rest of the nuraghe was re-used by Punic and Roman civilization. The five towers of the nuraghe were completely excavated, as was the residential area near tower E. The excavation uncovered fragments of ceramic, oil lamps, and coins of Roman age. They are in the museum of Sardara.

Gallery

Notes

Bibliography
 Vittorio Angius, Città e villaggi della Sardegna dell'Ottocento.Pabillonis-Zuri,Ilisso Editori, 2006.

Buildings and structures in Sardinia
Archaeological sites in Sardinia
Nuraghe